QUIET was an astronomy experiment to study the polarization of the cosmic microwave background radiation. QUIET stands for Q/U Imaging ExperimenT. The Q/U in the name refers to the ability of the telescope to measure the Q and U Stokes parameters simultaneously.  QUIET was located at an elevation of 5,080 metres (16,700 feet) at Llano de Chajnantor Observatory in the Chilean Andes. It began observing in late 2008 and finished observing in December 2010.

QUIET iwas the result of an international collaboration that had its origins in the CAPMAP, Cosmic Background Imager (CBI) and QUaD collaborations. The collaboration consisted of 7 groups in the United States (the California Institute of Technology, the University of Chicago, Columbia University, the Jet Propulsion Laboratory, the University of Miami, Princeton University and Stanford University), 4 groups in Europe (the University of Manchester, the Max-Planck-Institut für Radioastronomie Bonn, the University of Oslo and the University of Oxford) and one group in Japan (KEK; the first time a Japan group has been involved in CMB studies). Other members of the collaboration are from the University of California, Berkeley, the Goddard Space Flight Center and the Center for Astrophysics  Harvard & Smithsonian.

Instrument
QUIET had arrays of detectors at two frequencies: 43 GHz (Q band) and 95 GHz (W band). It used four telescopes, three of which were purpose-built 2 m ones with the other being the 7 m Crawford Hill telescope used for CAPMAP. As a result, it will have angular resolutions between a few arcminutes and several degrees. The detectors are mass-produced coherent correlation polarimeters.

The instrument was constructed in three phases. The first phase consisted of a 7-element 95 GHz array to demonstrate the technology. The second phase aims to mount a 91-element 95 GHz array (with 18 GHz bandwidth) and a 19-element 43 GHz array (with 8 GHz bandwidth) on 1.4 m cassegrain telescopes, mounted on what is currently the CBI platform. It is expected that these will start observing in 2008. The third phase aims to construct four further arrays by around 2010. Two of these will be at 43 GHz, with 91 elements each, and the other two will be at 95 GHz, with 397 elements each. These will then be mounted on three 2 m dishes on the CBI platform and the 7 m telescope.

The instrument is located at a height of 5,080 m at Llano de Chajnantor Observatory in the Chilean Andes. The site is owned by the Chilean government, and is leased to the Atacama Large Millimeter Array. The site was selected due to the altitude, current infrastructure and accessibility, as well as the low humidity of the site, which reduces the contamination of the detected signals by the atmosphere.

Science
QUIET measured the polarization of the cosmic microwave background radiation (CMB). This polarization is commonly split into two components: E-modes, which represent the gradient component, and B-modes, which give the curl component. It is thought that B-modes are formed both from primordial fluctuations due to cosmic inflation, and from gravitational lensing of the CMB. As of 2008, only E-modes have been detected. QUIET aims to detect and characterize the B-modes polarization for the first time, and to provide more accurate measurements of the E-mode polarization.

B-modes are thought to be much fainter than E-modes, as they are formed by higher order effects. The ratio of the E-mode to B-mode polarization is currently unknown, and the minimum detectable value of this can be used as a measure of the sensitivity of a CMB instrument. For QUIET this value is r=0.009, which corresponds to the energy scale of cosmic inflation being around  GeV.

QUIET's measurements of the CMB's power spectrum were designed to be between the multipoles of about 40 and 2,500, and will be made in a section of the sky known to have low foreground contamination.

Results 
The first season reported on power spectra from over 10000 hours of observation at 43 GHz in the multipole range ℓ = 25–475. The E-mode result was consistent with the standard cosmological model.  A B-mode spectrum was not detected. The second season paper included 95 GHz data.  Power spectra from ℓ = 25 to 975 were used to constrain the tensor-to-scalar ratio.

Status
As of March 2011, the QUIET team described the statusObservations were made from October 2008 through May 2009 using a 19-element 40 GHz instrument coupled to a 1.4 meter telescope located at the Llano de Chajnantor Observatory in Chile. Observations with a 91-element 90 GHz instrument on the same telescope finished in December 2010. The QUIET instrument has been dismantled from the old CBI mount.

See also
 Lists of telescopes

References

Journal article

 

Cosmic microwave background experiments
Astronomical observatories in Chile
Buildings and structures in Antofagasta Region